Chulahoma may refer to:

the town of Chulahoma, Mississippi
Chulahoma: The Songs of Junior Kimbrough, an EP by The Black Keys